Old Connaught House is an 18th-century house located in Rathmichael, Dublin, Ireland. Though originally built for bishop William Gore, shortly after his death in 1784 it was leased by William Plunket (later Baron Plunket). The house was occupied by the Plunket family for several generations, before being used by the Congregation of Christian Brothers as a novitiate school in the mid 20th century.

The house remained unoccupied for several years before being leased to a non-profit equestrian organisation. It was sold in 2000, renovated, and is now a development of residential apartments.

References

Buildings and structures in Dublin (city)
Country houses in Ireland